Ernst Heinrich Anton Pasqué (3 September 1821 – 20 March 1892) was a German operatic baritone, opera director, theatre director, writer and librettist.

Life 
Born in Cologne, at the age of 17 Pasqué decided to have his voice trained. At the instigation of Daniel-François-Esprit Auber, he was accepted at the Conservatoire de Paris. There he was a pupil of the tenor Antoine Ponchard.

On 4 May 1844 he made his debut as a "hunter" in the "night camp" in Mainz.

He came in 1845 as baritone to the Staatstheater Darmstadt. From 1846 to 1847 he was active in Leipzig, but then went back to Darmstadt.

In the summer of 1855 he was director of the Deutsche Oper in Amsterdam, and from 1856 to 1859 opera director in Weimar.

After illness and the loss of his voice he became an economic inspector in Darmstadt in 1859. Besides music-related literature, his main work "Geschichte der Musik und des Theater am Hofe zu Darmstadt", he also wrote stories and the libretto to Johann Joseph Abert's opera Astorga.

Pasqué died in Alsbach-Hähnlein at the age of 70.

Work 
Fiction
 Der Karlsberg. Kulturgeschichtlicher Roman. Verlag Ries, Homburg 1902
 Eine Visitenkarte Bismarcks. Erzählungen. Hillger Verlag, Leipzig 1899.
 In Paris. Heitere Geschichten aus den Lehrjahren eines Sängers. B. Behr Buchhandlung, Berlin 1872.
 Aus der Welt der Töne. Erlebnisse eines Mädchen-Quartetts im Haidehause. Onkel Reinholds Erzählungen a.d. Bereich der Oper, des Volksliedes, des Künstlerthums und des Tanzes. 70 Text-Illustrationen und vier Tonbilder. Leipzig, Verlag Otto Spamer, 1878.

non-fiction book
 Goethe’s Theaterleitung in Weimar. Leipzig 1863. , 
 Geschichte der Musik und des Theaters am Hofe zu Darmstadt. Mit Berücksichtigung der diesbezüglichen Hoffeste, der Biografien betheiligter Künstler und im Zusammenhange mit der allgemeinen deutschen Musik- und Theatergeschichte. Wittich, Darmstadt 1853.

Further reading 
 Ludwig Eisenberg: Ernst Pasqué. In Großes biographisches Lexikon der deutschen Bühne im XIX. Jahrhundert. Paul List, Leipzig 1903,  
 Norbert Bartnik: Ernst Pasqué. Der Träumer von „Haus Geyersberg“. Zur Erinnerung an den vor hundert Jahren gestorbenen Sänger, Schriftsteller und Heimatforscher. Selbstverlag, Alsbach-Hähnlein 1992.

External links 
 
 
 Pasqué, Ernst on BMLO
 Ernst Pasqué on WeGA
 Pasqué Ernst on OPERISSIMO

German opera directors
German theatre directors
German librettists
German operatic baritones
Conservatoire de Paris alumni
1821 births
1892 deaths
Musicians from Cologne
19th-century German male opera singers